Gordon Hezlam Jolly  (25 May 1913 – 26 October 1986) was a lawn bowls competitor for New Zealand.

Early life and family
Born in Cromwell on 25 May 1913, Jolly was the son of Ernest Jolly, who served as mayor of Cromwell, and Gabrielle Hezlam Jolly (née Dunne).

On 7 September 1940, Jolly married Molly Margaret Hungerford at Sacred Heart Church, North East Valley, Dunedin.

Lawn bowls
Jolly began playing bowls in Oamaru at the Meadowbank Bowling Club. Joining the Leith Bowling Club in Dunedin in 1946, he went on to win 18 Dunedin centre bowls titles.

At the 1966 World Outdoor Bowls Championship in Sydney, Jolly represented New Zealand in the men's triples and men's fours, winning the latter title along with Norm Lash, Ron Buchan and Bill O'Neill. Jolly won the 1970 fours title at the New Zealand National Bowls Championships, alongside J. W. Walls, A. J. Robinson and Peter Jolly, representing the Leith Bowling Club. The same year, at the 1970 British Commonwealth Games, he was part of the New Zealand men's four that placed 11th. At the 1974 British Commonwealth Games, he won the men's fours gold medal, partnering David Baldwin, Kerry Clark and John Somerville.

A life member of Bowls New Zealand, Jolly served as a national selector and secretary–treasurer, and was president in 1968.

Honours
In the 1977 New Year Honours, Jolly was appointed an Officer of the Order of the British Empire, for services to bowls. He was an inaugural inductee into the Bowls New Zealand Hall of Fame in 2013.

Death
Jolly died at Dunedin on 26 October 1986, and he was buried at Andersons Bay Cemetery. His wife, Molly, died the following year.

References

1913 births
1986 deaths
People from Cromwell, New Zealand
New Zealand male bowls players
Commonwealth Games gold medallists for New Zealand
Bowls players at the 1970 British Commonwealth Games
Bowls players at the 1974 British Commonwealth Games
New Zealand Officers of the Order of the British Empire
New Zealand referees and umpires
Burials at Andersons Bay Cemetery
Sportspeople from Oamaru
Sportspeople from Dunedin
Commonwealth Games medallists in lawn bowls
Bowls World Champions
20th-century New Zealand people
Medallists at the 1974 British Commonwealth Games